Mexico City is one of the 32 federal entities of Mexico, the others being the 31 states. According to the 2020 Mexican Census, it is the second most populated entity with  inhabitants and the smallest by land area spanning .

Despite containing the word "City", it is not governed as a city but as a unit consisting of multiple subdivisions. As a result of the Political Reforms enacted in 2016, it is no longer designated as a federal district and became a city, a member entity of the Mexican federation, seat of the Powers of the Union and the capital of Mexico.

Mexico City is not organized into municipalities. Headed by a mayor, these boroughs kept the same territory and name as the former , while expanding their local government powers. Boroughs are considered as third-level subdivisions for statistical data collection and cross-country comparisons. The traditional center of Mexico City comprises four boroughs: Benito Juárez, Cuauhtémoc, Miguel Hidalgo and Venustiano Carranza. 

The largest borough by population is Iztapalapa, with 1,835,486 residents, while the smallest is Milpa Alta with 152,685 residents. Iztacalco is the most densely populated subdivision in Mexico.

The most recent boroughs are Benito Juárez, Cuauhtémoc, Miguel Hidalgo and Venustiano Carranza, all established in 1970 out of the former circumscription of Mexico City.

Boroughs

Notes

References

External links

 https://www.cdmx.gob.mx Government of Mexico City, official website (Spanish)

 
Geography of Mexico City